Manilkara excisa (known locally as either sapodilla bullet, sapodilla or simply sappa) is an endangered species of tall tree in the sapodilla family. It is endemic to the extremely steep, forested limestone hills of Trelawny, Cockpit Country and St. James parishes in Jamaica, where, although it is highly prized for its wood, it is threatened by habitat loss.

References

excisa
Plants described in 1908
Endangered plants
Endemic flora of Jamaica
Taxonomy articles created by Polbot